The Toquz Oghuz ("Turks of Nine Bones") was a political alliance of nine Turkic-speaking Tiele tribes in Inner Asia, during the early Middle Ages. The Toquz Oghuz was consolidated and subordinated within the First Turkic Khaganate (552–743) and remained as a nine-tribe alliance after the Khaganate fragmented.

Oghuz is a Turkic word meaning "community" and toquz means "nine". Similarly the Karluks were possibly known as the Üç-Oğuz – üç meaning "three". The root of the generalized ethnic term "oghuz" is og-, meaning "clan, tribe"; which in turn, according to Kononov, descends from the ancient Turkic word ög meaning "mother" (however, Golden considered such a further derivation impossible). Initially the oguz designated "tribes" or "tribal union", and eventually became an ethnonym.

The Toquz Oghuz were perhaps first mentioned in the Orkhon inscriptions written in the 730s. The nine tribes were named in Chinese histories as the Huihe/Uyghur (回纥), Pugu (仆骨), Hun (浑), Bayegu (拔野古), Tongluo (同罗), Sijie (思结), Qibi (契苾), A-Busi (阿布思) and Gulunwugusi (骨仑屋骨思). The first seven named – who lived north of the Gobi Desert – were dominant, whereas the A-Busi and Gulunwugu(si) emerged later and were accepted on an equal footing with the others some time after 743. The A-Busi apparently originated as a sub-tribal group within the Sijie and the Gulunwugu(si) as a combination of two other tribes.

Latter Gōktürk Khagan Bilge considered the Toquz Oghuz "[his] own people". It is also mentioned in Kul Tigin inscriptions that the Göktürks and Toquz Oghuz were fighting five times in a year. 
𐱃𐰸𐰆𐰕:𐰆𐰍𐰕:𐰉𐰆𐰑𐰣:𐰚𐰤𐱅𐰃:𐰉𐰆𐰑𐰣𐰢:𐰼𐱅𐰃:𐱅𐰭𐰼𐰃:𐰘𐰃𐰼:𐰉𐰆𐰞𐰍𐰴𐰃𐰤:𐰇𐰲𐰇𐰤:𐰖𐰍𐰃:𐰉𐰆𐰡𐰃
Toquz Oγuz budun kentü budunïm erti Teŋіri jer bolγaqïn üčün yaγï boltï.
"Nine Oguzes were my people. As Tengri and the earth came to disorder, they rose against us."

Likewise, foreign sources suggested the political association of some Toquz Oghuz tribes to Göktürks. A Khotanese Saka text about Turks in Ganzhou mentioned saikairä ttūrkä chārä (< OTrk. *sïqïr türk çor). The Sïqïr Türks were identified with the Sikāri in Sogdian documents as well as the Sijie, who were mentioned as Tujue Sijie 突厥思結 in Zizhi Tongjian. Among the Eastern Turkic tribes who dwelt south the Gobi desert, Tang Huiyao listed the Sijie (erroneously rendered as Enjie 恩結), who dwelt in the Lushan military governorate 盧山都督府, and Fuli, who dwelt in the same jimi province of Dailin as the Sijie's splinter tribe A-Busi. The Fuli(-yu) (匐利[羽]), or Fuli(-ju) (伏利[具]), were identifiable as the Fuluo (覆羅) in other Chinese sources and the Bökli-Çöligil (OTrk. 𐰋𐰇𐰚𐰲𐰃:𐰲𐰇𐰠𐰏𐰠), who appeared on Kül-tegin inscription and were proposed to have originated from Tungusic Mohe, Koreans, or ethnic Turkic peoples. Kenzheakhmet (2014:297-299) links the Sijie'''s splinter-tribe Abusi (< OTrk. *Abïz) to the Fuli (< OTrk. *Bükeli < büke "snake, dragon" + coordinating conjunctive suffix -li, possibly).

Another list of nine names - Yaoluoge (藥羅葛) (< OTrk. 𐰖𐰍𐰞𐰴𐰺‎ Yaglaqar), Huduoge (胡咄葛), Guluowu (啒羅勿), Mogexiqi (貊歌息訖), A-Wudi (阿勿嘀), Gesa (葛薩), Huwasu (斛嗢素), Yaowuge (藥勿葛), & Xiyawu (奚牙勿)- appeared in the Old Book of Tang and New Book of Tang. According to Haneda (1957), Toquz Oğuz were the Yaglaqar-led group of nine clans included in the Uighur tribe. In contrast, Golden (1992) proposed that Toquz Oğuz were the Tang Huiyao's nine-tribe group led by the Uyghur, which in turn comprised the nine subtribes led by Yaglaqar. The Shine Usu inscription mentioned that the Yağlaqar ruled over the On-Uyğur "Ten[-Tribes] Uyghur" and Toquz Oğuz "Nine[-Tribes] Oghuz". Meanwhile, Hashimoto, Katayama, and Senga propose that the Tang Huiyao's list (led by Uyghur) contained the names of the Toquz Oghuz tribes proper, while each name in the two lists (led by Yağlaqar) in the Books of Tang recorded each surname of each of nine subtribal chiefs (e.g. Uyghur chief's surname is Yağlaqar; Sijie chief's surname is Gesa'', etc.).

Notes

References

Turkic peoples of Asia
Uyghurs
History of Imperial China
Nomadic groups in Eurasia
Extinct Turkic peoples
Tribes of the Göktürks